Gumawana is an Austronesian language spoken by people living on the Amphlett Islands of the Milne Bay Province of Papua New Guinea.

References

Further reading
 

Nuclear Papuan Tip languages
Languages of Milne Bay Province